Kevis Coley (born June 23, 1982) is a former American football linebacker. He was signed by the New York Giants as an undrafted free agent in 2006. He played college football at Southern Mississippi.

Coley has also been a member of the Jacksonville Jaguars, Cincinnati Bengals and Houston Texans.

External links
Houston Texans bio
Southern Miss Golden Eagles bio

1982 births
Living people
People from Palatka, Florida
American football linebackers
Southern Miss Golden Eagles football players
New York Giants players
Jacksonville Jaguars players
Cincinnati Bengals players
Houston Texans players